The Art for All Foundation and Center  is a non-profit Thai organization sponsored by the United Nations Economic and Social Commission for Asia and the Pacific (ESCAP), Thailand's Commission on Higher Education, Ministry of Culture and Chulalongkorn University that conducts programs for youths with disabilities and other disadvantaged groups such as indigenous hill tribe children as well as prison inmates.

History

In 1997, Channarong Pornrungroj, the former Dean of the Faculty of Fine and Applied Arts at Chulalongkorn University started an art program for disadvantaged and disabled children. “Art for All” uses art as a vehicle for developing the skills and talents of both disabled and non-disabled individuals. In 2007, the Art for All Foundation partnered with the Faculty of Fine and Applied Arts of Thailand's largest university, Chulalongkorn University, creating a campus office known as the Art for All Center. Chulalongkorn University prematurely pulled funding for the Art for All Center's 3-year contract due to accounting and reporting irregularities. The University is no longer associated with Art for All. 

Program volunteers, in conjunction with gifted and average children along with the blind, deaf and physically or mentally impaired all take part in a diverse range of activities. They range from musical, visual and mixed media, dance, drama to literature experiences. It is through these activities that they learn about cooperative teamwork, life skills, the creative process and themselves.

Activities
The Art for All program offers and conducts a diverse array of activities where both mainstream and disadvantaged young people learn to work cooperatively together. They range from weekend art education exchange sessions to the larger annual, regional and indigenous Hilltribe Art for All Camps as well as one for prisoners facing life and death sentences.

Art for All also organizes art exhibitions, workshops, hosts the international art education model group as well as conducts research and publishing an annual that incorporates leading research papers related to art, education and the underprivileged. The Art for All program’s dedicated staff brings at least 20 activities per year to the people of Thailand and the world community since its inception in 1997.

International Education Model and Research Forum
The Art for All international program brings together key researchers and program representatives to present their current papers in an exchange forum about the disabled art education programs in their own country.

 Art for All Thailand is proud to acknowledge the development of an "Art for All 2" in Malaysia that was the direct result of their representatives participating in Thailand's original Art for All program. Malaysia's Art for All 2 commenced in October 2001.
 The United Nations in 2002 selected the Art for All program to be exhibited in Australia and Japan.
 Thailand's 2007 international model Art for All program focused on its ASEAN neighbors and had 40 representatives from Bhutan, Brunei, Cambodia, Indonesia, Lao PDR, Malaysia, Myanmar, Philippines, South Korea and Vietnam participate.

References
Death Row Prisoners Find Solace in Art Lessons, Shanravee Tansubhapol Aug 7, 2006, Bangkok Post
Empowering Through Art, SEA Write Laureate Naowarat Pongpaiboon, Jul 24, 2006, Bangkok Post
Art for All Camp in Nakon Nayok, Sep 2006, Thai Airways In-flight Publication, Kinnaree
Against the Odds, Chompoo Trakullertsathien Feb 3, 2004, Bangkok Post
Arts & Hearts, Chompoo Trakullertsathien Dec 21, 2003, Bangkok Post
Disabled by Society's Norm, Rojana Manovawalailao Mar 3, 2003, The Nation
5th Art for All, Oct, 2003, Thai Airways In-flight Publication, Kinnaree
Art Therapy, Chompoo Trakullertsathien Sep 11, 2003, Bangkok Post
Art for All, Sabai-Nang, Feb, 2002, Thai Airways In-flight Publication, Kinnaree
Art for All 2, Visual Arts for the Special Needs, Wairah Marzuki Dec, 2001, Balai Seni Lukis Negara Malaysia Report
Art for All, Dr. Channarong Pornrungroj, Sep - Nov, 2001, Japan Letter - Newsletter from Japan's Cultural Center, Bangkok (The Japan Foundation)
Looking Beyond Disabilities, Ooi Kok Chuen Jul 30, 2001, New Straits Times Malaysia
Channarong's State of the Art, Ooi Kok Chuen Jul 24, 2001, New Straits Times Malaysia
Art for All, Sermsak Sukarawan, Feb, 2001 Thai Airways In-flight Publication, Kinnaree
Art-enabled Kids, Karnjariya Sukrung May 7, 2000, Bangkok Post

External resources
Art for All Center:
Thai: https://web.archive.org/web/20090528081354/http://www.artforall.or.th/artforallcenter/index.htm
Art for All Foundation:
English: https://web.archive.org/web/20100914162040/http://www.artforall.or.th/Eng/index.htm
Thai: https://web.archive.org/web/20090423071313/http://www.artforall.or.th/index.htm
Art for All 2 Malaysia: https://web.archive.org/web/20110728033434/http://www.ytlcommunity.com/commnews/shownews.asp?newsid=5337

Chulalongkorn University
Non-profit organizations based in Thailand
Foundations based in Thailand
Arts foundations based in Asia